Sowmya Mahadevan was a participant in the 2006 Airtel Super Singer competition, where she attained the maximum number of votes to participate it the "lifeline" round.

References

Indian women playback singers
Living people
Tamil playback singers
Year of birth missing (living people)